Sacred Water is a 2016 Rwandan film directed and produced by Olivier Jourdain.

Plot 
The story of a young lady travelling to a village where ejaculation by women was very important to men and the culture connotations that is attached to it.

Cast
 Dusabe Vestine

References

Rwandan drama films
2016 films